Navarra was a cruiser serving the Spanish Navy from 1923 to 1956. Construction on Reina Victoria Eugenia—the ship's original name—began in 1915 by Sociedad Española de Construcción Naval in Ferrol. The design showed considerable British design influence resembling contemporary British Town-class cruisers. The boilers were re-arranged into three rooms to give three funnels. The ship was renamed Republica in 1931 and assumed the name Navarra in 1936.

Service

The ship was ordered as the Reina Victoria Eugenia (named after Queen consort Victoria Eugenie of Battenberg), laid down on 31 March 1915, launched 21 April 1920 and completed on 15 January 1923. She was flagship of the Spanish squadron during the Rif war. After the proclamation of the Second Spanish Republic in 1931 she became part of the Spanish Republican Navy and was renamed Republica.

At the start of the Spanish Civil War in 1936 she was being refitted in Cadiz and was seized by the Nationalist side. The refit included replacing the old coal-fired boilers with oil fired units. A new superstructure was added, one funnel was removed and six 6-inch guns were moved to the centre line (three guns were removed). Four German 88 mm AA guns were also fitted and the torpedo tubes removed.

The ship had limited war service and later was used as a training ship until her retirement in 1956. When in service during the last months of the Spanish Civil War, Navarra was nicknamed Sigamos a la flota ("Follow the fleet"), after Fred Astaire and Ginger Rogers' film, because it was much slower than the two other surviving Nationalist cruisers (Canarias and Almirante Cervera).

References

Bibliography

External links

Cruisers of the Spanish Navy
Ships built in Ferrol, Spain
1920 ships
Military units and formations of the Spanish Civil War